Events relating to birding and ornithology that occurred in 1901 include:

The description of the blue-wattled bulbul, Cape Verde swift, Solomons frogmouth, Colima pygmy-owl, fearful owl, green-breasted pitta and waterfall swift, Rothschild's lobe-billed bird-of-paradise.

Events
 Rossitten Bird Observatory in East Prussia, founded by Johannes Thienemann, opened on 1 January under the auspices of the Deutsche Ornithologen-Gesellschaft
 Royal Australasian Ornithologists Union founded in Melbourne, Australia
 Death of Waldemar Hartwig

Publications
 Henry Seebohm’s The Birds of Siberia published
 Journal Cassinia first published
 Journal Emu first published
Howard Saunders The Antarctic Manual for the use of the Expedition of 1901. Edited by George Murray, F.L.S. Birds : [birds]  by Howard Saunders, F.L.S., F.Z.S., R.E.G.S. pp. 225–238. Royal Geographical Society, 1 Savile Row,London, 1901.] 
Frank Finn List of the Birds in the Indian Museum. Part I. Families Corvidae, Paradiseidae, Ptilonorhynchidae and Crateropodidae, By F. Finn B.A. F.Z.S., Deputy Superintendent of the Indian Museum. 8vo. Calcutta, 1901. Pp. i-xv, 1-115. Price 1 rupee.
Jonathan Dwight The sequence of plumages and moults of the passerine birds of New York, Annals of the New York Academy of Sciences 13, 1900, S. 73–360
Boyd Alexander On the Birds of the Gold Coast Colony and its Hinterland Ibis  Volume 44, Issue3 1902 :355 -377

Ongoing events
Osbert Salvin and Frederick DuCane Godman 1879–1904. Biologia Centrali-Americana . Aves
Members of the German Ornithologists' Society in Journal für Ornithologie online BHL
The Ibis
Novitates Zoologicae
Ornithologische Monatsberichte Verlag von R. Friedländer & Sohn, Berlin. Years of publication: 1893–1938 online Zobodat
Ornis; internationale Zeitschrift für die gesammte Ornithologie.Vienna 1885-1905online BHL
Anton Reichenow Die Vögel Afrikas Neudamm, J. Neumann,1900-05 online BHL
The Auk online BHL
Birding and ornithology by year

Birding and ornithology